Allium chrysocephalum is a plant species native to China, in the provinces Gansu, Qinghai, and Sichuan. It grows at elevations of 3400–4800 m.

Allium chrysocephalum produces narrow cylindrical bulbs about 10 mm in diameter. Scapes are up to 25 cm long, round in cross-section. Leaves are flat, up to 10 mm across, about half the length of the scapes. Flowers are bright yellow.

References

chrysocephalum
Onions
Flora of China
Flora of Gansu
Flora of Qinghai
Flora of Sichuan
Plants described in 1887